Mercedes-Benz Challenge previously known as Mercedes-Benz Grand Challenge, is a single-make sports car racing series based in the Brazil organized by Mais Brasil Esportes and Mercedes-Benz. In 2018, the championship runs alongside Copa Truck series and will make its first international appearance this October in Rivera, Uruguay.

Champions

References

External links
  

 
Auto racing series in Brazil
Sports car racing series
Recurring sporting events established in 2011
Motorsport competitions in Brazil